Przyjezierze  is a village in the administrative district of Gmina Moryń, within Gryfino County, West Pomeranian Voivodeship, in north-western Poland.

For the history of the region, see History of Pomerania.

The village has a population of 270.

References

Przyjezierze